Júlio César Mendes Moreira (born 19 January 1983) is a retired Brazilian footballer.

Biography

São Paulo state
Born in Pouso Alegre, Minas Gerais state, Júlio César was signed by Portuguesa Santista in 2004. In January 2005 he extended his contract for 1 more year (until 31 October 2005) but left for Inter de Limeira on loan. He finished as the bottom club in 2005 Campeonato Paulista.

Europe
On 1 December 2005 he left for Clube Recreativo e Atlético Catalano. In January 2006 he left for Bulgarian A PFG club PFC Belasitsa.

On 1 September 2006 he was signed by Turkish Süper Lig club Denizlispor in 1-year contract. He played 23 league games. On 7 August 2007 he signed a new 2-year contract. In June 2008 he was transferred to fellow Süper Lig club Kocaelispor.

After being close to a signature with Terek Grozny, he then returned to Bulgaria for Montana. In January 2010 he moved again, to Ukrainian club Metalurh Donetsk on a -year contract.

He then played for Sriwijaya F.C. of Indonesia Super League.

Return to Brazil
In January 2011 he was signed by Minas Gerais club Ipatinga. On 1 September he left for Salgueiro in short-term deal.

Ravan Baku
In January 2014 César moved to Ravan Baku in the Azerbaijan Premier League, signing an 18-month contract.

Later years
César returned to Brazil in 2015, playing in just two games in two seasons with Caldas Novas in the first division of the Campeonato Goiano, the state league in Goiás. He moved to Bahia de Feira in 2017, where he did not play any matches, before retiring from football.

References

External links
 Profile at TFF.org
 
 

Brazilian footballers
Associação Atlética Portuguesa (Santos) players
Associação Atlética Internacional (Limeira) players
PFC Belasitsa Petrich players
Denizlispor footballers
Kocaelispor footballers
FC Montana players
FC Metalurh Donetsk players
Ipatinga Futebol Clube players
Salgueiro Atlético Clube players
First Professional Football League (Bulgaria) players
Süper Lig players
Ukrainian Premier League players
Brazilian expatriate footballers
Expatriate footballers in Bulgaria
Expatriate footballers in Turkey
Expatriate footballers in Ukraine
Expatriate footballers in Indonesia
Brazilian expatriate sportspeople in Bulgaria
Brazilian expatriate sportspeople in Turkey
Brazilian expatriate sportspeople in Ukraine
Brazilian expatriate sportspeople in Indonesia
Association football fullbacks
People from Minas Gerais
Living people
1983 births
Sriwijaya F.C. players
Adana Demirspor footballers
Ravan Baku FC players
Sportspeople from Minas Gerais